The 1968  New South Wales  state election  was held on 24 February 1968. The election was for all of the 94 seats in the  Legislative Assembly. The Liberal Party, led by Premier Robert Askin, in Coalition with the Country Party of Deputy Premier Charles Cutler, was elected for a second term—the first time that a non-Labor government had been reelected since before World War II.

Redistribution
An extensive redistribution of electoral boundaries was undertaken in 1966 by a commission consisting of Judge Amsberg of the District Court, the Surveyor-General, G Prince and the Electoral Commissioner J McDonald. Following  instructions from the government of Robin Askin, the redistribution gave an increased weighting to the votes of electors in rural New South Wales . Of the 94 electorates, 48 were to be classified as "urban"  with an average enrollment of 27,531 and 46 were "country" with an average enrollment of 20,882. However, a continuing movement of population from rural to urban NSW meant that many of the "country" seats were effectively situated in the outskirts of Sydney, where the Liberal Party traditionally had strong electoral support. Four seats (Casino, Cobar, Dulwich Hill and Redfern) were abolished and four new seats (Campbelltown, Corrimal, Merrylands and Northcott) were created . A further 9 seats, Ashfield-Croydon ( renamed Ashfield), Concord (Yaralla), Hartley (Blue Mountains), Illawarra (Kembla), Kurri Kurri (Wallsend), Mudgee (Burrendong), Ryde (Fuller), Sturt (Broken Hill) and Wollongong-Kembla (Wollongong), were extensively changed and renamed. The notional net result of the redistribution was to reduce the Labor Party's representation by at least 5 and possibly 9 seats and to reduce the Country Party by 1. The redistribution was unsuccessfully opposed by the Labor Party with parliamentary walkouts, legal appeals and public rallies.

Issues
At the beginning of 1968, the Liberal/Country Party Coalition was widely regarded as a competent, non-controversial first-term government. With the aid of a favourable redistribution, it seemed certain of electoral victory; and as a result the campaign failed to generate significant public interest. Since 1965 the government had resolved the problem of cost over-runs and building delays at the Sydney Opera House by forcing the resignation of the architect, Jørn Utzon. Although in retrospect this move was widely censured, at the time it occurred it was generally well received by the public. New government policies during the campaign included an increase in state aid for private schools, increased spending on hospitals and a consumer affairs agency to monitor prices.

In contrast to the coalition, Labor's leader and former Premier, Jack Renshaw, was unable to appeal much to urban voters and had a hard time adjusting to television. He possessed also the disadvantage of having led to defeat in 1965 an ALP administration widely seen as tired and unfocused. Labor's campaign promises included four weeks of annual leave for all employees on state controlled award wages, the restoration of the Sydney City Council, price controls for basic food items and state control of Credit Unions. Renshaw was unable to match the government's promises of aid for private schools, which was a difficult ideological question for Labor.

Results

Prior to the election the Country Party had gained the seats of Bathurst from the Labor Party and Oxley from the Liberal Party at by-elections caused by the deaths of sitting members. There was a slight swing to the Labor Party in the two party preferred vote at the election. However, the effects of the redistribution resulted in a significant improvement in the position of the coalition government and changes in seats at the election reflected the effects of the re-distribution rather than a swing in voter sentiment. The government had a buffer of 6 seats in the new parliament:

 Liberal 36 seats
 Country Party 17 seats
 Australian Labor Party 39 seats
 Independent 2 seats

The DLP contested 42 seats but achieved less than 3% of the statewide vote while the Communist party was reduced to 6 candidates who received negligible support. The New State Movement, which had suffered a devastating defeat at a plebiscite on the formation of a new state in New England in 1967, contested 4 seats and gained 0.80% of the total vote but up to 35% in individual seats.

The election marked the first time that a non-Labor government in New South Wales had been reelected since the Coalition won three consecutive elections from 1932 to 1938.

Seats changing party representation
This table lists changes in party representation since the 1965 election 

† Bathurst was won by the Country Party at a 1967 by-election caused by the death of Labor's Gus Kelly

‡Oxley was won by the Country Party at a 1965 by-election caused by the death of the Liberal Party's Les Jordan

Key dates

Results
{{Australian elections/Title row
| table style = float:right;clear:right;margin-left:1em;
| title        = New South Wales state election, 24 February 1968
| house        = Legislative Assembly
| series       = New South Wales state election
| back         = 1965
| forward      = 1971
| enrolled     = 2,356,977
| total_votes  = 2,219,979
| turnout %    = 94.19
| turnout chg  = +0.28
| informal     = 58,409
| informal %   = 2.63
| informal chg = +0.59
}}

|}

{{ bar box |float=right| title=Popular vote | titlebar=#ddd | width=600px | barwidth=410px | bars=

}}All electorates were contested

Aftermath
Robert Askin and Charles Cutler remained Premier and Deputy Premier throughout the term of the parliament. Renshaw was replaced as the Leader of the Labor Party by Pat Hills in December 1968. During the parliament there were 5 by-elections. These produced no change in party representation with the exception of the Liberal Party losing Georges River to Labor's Frank Walker.

References

See also
 Candidates of the 1968 New South Wales state election
 Members of the New South Wales Legislative Assembly, 1968–1971

Elections in New South Wales
1968 elections in Australia
1960s in New South Wales
February 1968 events in Australia